The 2019–20 Alaska Anchorage Seawolves men's ice hockey season was the 41st season of play for the program, the 36th at the Division I level and the 27th in the WCHA conference. The Seawolves represented the University of Alaska Anchorage and were coached by Matt Curley, in his 2nd season.

Departures

Recruiting

Roster

As of August 18, 2019.

Standings

Schedule and results

|-
!colspan=12 style=";" | Regular Season

|-
!colspan=12 style=";" | 

|- align="center" bgcolor="#e0e0e0"
|colspan=12|Alaska Anchorage Lost Series 0–2

Scoring statistics

Goaltending statistics

Rankings

References

Alaska Anchorage Seawolves men's ice hockey seasons
Alaska Anchorage Seawolves
Alaska Anchorage Seawolves
2019 in sports in Alaska
2020 in sports in Alaska